Jazz in Spain began with an interest in Dixieland or New Orleans jazz. In that time it evolved into other styles, often influenced by visiting Americans. In 1947 Don Byas introduced Tete Montoliu to bebop, and other efforts to combine jazz with flamenco occurred. Catalan and Galician music have influenced some regions.

Jazz in Spain suffered from many difficulties. These included cultural, political, and economic systems that were unsuitable for creativity. Francisco Franco's regime placed restraints on jazz. The return to democracy and the development of the economy allowed jazz to expand.

Spain has many outdoor jazz festivals. The Donostia-San Sebastian Jazz Festival began in 1966. In the middle 1970s, the festival attracted Charles Mingus, Tete Montoliu, Ella Fitzgerald, Oscar Peterson, Dizzy Gillespie, Herbie Hancock, Lionel Hampton, John Lee Hooker, Sonny Rollins, B.B. King, Woody Herman, Freddie Hubbard, Weather Report, Gato Barbieri, Art Blakey, Mercer Ellington, McCoy Tyner, Chick Corea, Clark Terry, and Miles Davis. The festival held in Vitoria-Gasteiz, set up in 1977, also attracts musicians.

Jazz festivals 
Festival de Jazz de Vitoria (Vitoria-Gasteiz)
Festival de Jazz de San Sebastian (Donostia-San Sebastian)
Festival de Jazz de Terrassa (Terrassa)
Festival de Jazz de Valencia (Mar-i-jazz)

Jazz musicians in Spain 

 Ester Andujar - singer
 Juan d'Anyelica - guitarist in flamenco and jazz.
 Paloma Berganza - singer
 Alberto Conde - pianist
 Chano Domínguez - pianist
 Ramón Evaristo - bandleader, violinist
 Pedro Iturralde - saxophonist in jazz and classical
 Tete Montoliu - pianist
 Jorge Pardo - saxophonist and flautist who worked with Chick Corea
 Oscar Peñas - guitarist and composer
 Alberto Porro Carmona - jazz conductor, musicologist, composer, and saxophone player
 Mario Rossi- samba and jazz
 Jorge Rossy - drummer who worked 10 years with the first trio of Brad Mehldau
 Perico Sambeat - saxophonist, flamenco nominee in Latin Grammy Awards of 2005
 Ximo Tebar - guitarist
 Ignasi Terraza - pianist

References

External links 
 Tomajazz: Spanish jazz, articles, interviews, news
 Apoloybaco

 
Jazz